Yucay is a town in southern Peru. It is the capital of the Yucay District, which is near the center of Urubamba Province in the Cusco Region of southern Peru.

The area in which Yucay is located is commonly called the Sacred Valley of the Incas. Many Inca ruins are in the Sacred Valley near the Urubamba River and extending up the nearby hillsides in agricultural terraces called andenes.

References

External links
Satellite map at Maplandia

Populated places in the Cusco Region